Calotriton, or the European brook newts, is a genus of newts native to the Pyrenees and central Catalonia (Catalan Pre-coastal Range). These amphibians were formerly placed within genus Euproctus, but the genus was resurrected in 2005. Instead of Euproctus, they seem more closely related to Triturus, their sister taxon.

Evolution
Calotriton and Triturus are estimated to have split approximately 8 myr ago. This may have been associated with adaptation to fast-running, well-oxygenated mountain streams (instead of ponds in Triturus), leading to some superficial similarity with Euproctus in convergent evolution: strongly depressed head and body, and reduction or even absence of lungs.

Description
Calotriton are small- to medium-sized newts,  in total length. Skin is covered with tubercles bearing horny tips, more so above than beneath, which can be completely smooth. Limbs are moderate, with four fingers and five toes. Body is rounded or slightly depressed. There is no cutaneous dorsal and caudal crest, not even during the breeding season. Tail is about as long as head and body and compressed from side; longer in females and deeper in males. Lungs are absent or very reduced.

Species
There are two species:

References

 Andreas Nöllert & Christel Nöllert: Die Amphibien Europas. – Franckh-Kosmos, Stuttgart, 1992.

External links

Newts
Amphibians of Europe
Amphibian genera
Taxa named by John Edward Gray